James Buchanan "Bucky" Barnes, more commonly known as Bucky Barnes, is a fictional character portrayed by Sebastian Stan in the Marvel Cinematic Universe (MCU) media franchise, based on the Marvel Comics character of the same name and sometimes referred to by his alias, the Winter Soldier, and later as the White Wolf. Barnes is childhood best friends with Steve Rogers who serves alongside him during World War II. However, Barnes gets separated from Rogers and is captured by Hydra who transforms him into a super soldier and assassin known as the Winter Soldier. Years later, after reuniting with Rogers and getting assisted by him, along with Sam Wilson, Clint Barton, Wanda Maximoff, and Scott Lang, he is eventually cured of his programming by Shuri in Wakanda. He then aids Rogers and the other Avengers in the battle against Thanos. Shortly after getting restored to life, he witnesses Rogers' retirement and tries to make his own way in life with his amends. He later partners up with Wilson, supporting him as the new Captain America.

, Barnes has appeared in seven films, as well as in a lead role in the miniseries The Falcon and the Winter Soldier (2021) and in a guest role in the animated series What If...? (2021). He will return in the upcoming film Thunderbolts (2024).

Concept and creation
When Joe Simon created his initial sketch of Captain America for Marvel Comics precursor Timely Comics in 1940, he included a young sidekick. "The boy companion was simply named Bucky, after my friend Bucky Pierson, a star on our high school basketball team," Simon said in his autobiography. Following the character's debut in Captain America Comics #1 (March 1941), Bucky Barnes appeared alongside the title star in virtually every story in that publication and other Timely series, and was additionally part of the all-kid team the Young Allies. Live-action performances of Steve Rogers in television and film serials began within a few years after its creation, with a 1990 feature film resulting in critical and financial failure, but none of these adaptations included Bucky as a character.

In 2005, Marvel launched a new Captain America series (Volume 5) with writer Ed Brubaker, who revealed that Bucky did not die in World War II. It was revealed that after the plane exploded, General Vasily Karpov and the crew of a Russian patrol submarine found Bucky's cold-preserved body, albeit with his left arm severed. Bucky was revived in Moscow, but had brain damage with amnesia as a result of the explosion. Scientists attached a bionic arm, periodically upgrading it as technology improved. Programmed to be a Soviet assassin for Department X – under the code name the Winter Soldier – he is sent on covert wetwork missions and becomes increasingly ruthless and efficient as he kills in the name of the state.

In the mid-2000s, Kevin Feige realized that Marvel still owned the rights to the core members of the Avengers, which included Captain America and his associated characters. Feige, a self-professed "fanboy", envisioned creating a shared universe just as creators Stan Lee and Jack Kirby had done with their comic books in the early 1960s. In 2005, Marvel received a $525 million investment from Merrill Lynch, allowing them to independently produce ten films, including Captain America. Paramount Pictures agreed to distribute the film. In April 2010, Sebastian Stan, who had been mentioned in media accounts as a possibility for the title role in Captain America, was cast as Bucky Barnes. Stan was contracted for multiple films.

The origin story of Bucky Barnes follows that of the comic books, particularly Ultimate Marvel for certain elements like growing up in Brooklyn and Bucky being a childhood best friend of Steve Rogers, rather than a younger sidekick met later, but diverges from there, with "the Winter Soldier play[ing] a major role that's completely different to the comics". In the comic books, Steve Rogers is murdered in the aftermath of the Civil War storyline, leading to Bucky Barnes becoming the next Captain America. In the MCU Rogers survives Civil War, eventually passing the mantle of Captain America to Sam Wilson in Avengers: Endgame.

Fictional character biography

Early life and World War II

James Barnes was born on March 10, 1917. He and Steve Rogers became childhood best friends and on many occasions Barnes would protect Rogers from bullies. During World War II, Barnes is drafted in the U.S. Army, while Rogers is rejected from the service due to his numerous medical conditions. Barnes fights in Europe while Rogers is chosen for the Super Soldier Program by Dr. Abraham Erskine and becomes Captain America.

In 1943, while on tour in Italy performing for active servicemen, Rogers learns that Barnes' unit was MIA in a battle against the Nazi forces of Johann Schmidt. Refusing to believe that Barnes is dead, Rogers has Peggy Carter and engineer Howard Stark fly him behind enemy lines to mount a solo rescue attempt. Rogers infiltrates the fortress of Schmidt's Nazi science division, Hydra, freeing Barnes and the other prisoners, with Barnes having just been experimented on by Hydra. Barnes becomes part of an elite unit assembled by Rogers called the Howling Commandos, participating in numerous missions against Hydra and the Nazis. However, during one such mission, Barnes falls off of a train and is seemingly killed.

Hydra assassin

The Hydra experimentation on Barnes causes him to survive his fall, and he is recaptured by the Hydra wing of the Soviet Union, where he is tortured and brainwashed by Arnim Zola and turned into the Winter Soldier, a mind-controlled super soldier with a  metal prosthetic arm. During the 20th century, Barnes commits numerous assassinations and terrorist acts throughout the world, such as the assassination of John F. Kennedy, as a means for Hydra to create a singular world government under their control. In between missions, Barnes is placed in cryogenic sleep. During the Korean War, Barnes was confronted by the American super soldier Isaiah Bradley in Goyang and half of his cybernetic arm was destroyed during the skirmish.

In 1991, Hydra uses Barnes to kill Howard and Maria Stark in an assassination made to look like a car accident, during which he steals a case of super soldier serum from their car.

In 2009, Barnes was sent on a mission to assassinate a nuclear scientist in Odessa. S.H.I.E.L.D. agent Natasha Romanoff attempted to protect the scientist, but Barnes managed to kill the scientist by shooting a round through Romanoff's stomach while she covered him.

In 2014, Nick Fury is ambushed by assailants led by Barnes, still operating as the Winter Soldier, which leads Fury to warn Rogers that S.H.I.E.L.D. has been compromised. Fury is gunned down by Barnes, before handing Rogers a vital flash drive. Rogers discovers a Hydra plot to use three Helicarriers to sweep the globe, using satellite-guided guns to eliminate every individual who is a threat to Hydra. Rogers, Romanoff and Sam Wilson are ambushed by the Winter Soldier, whom Rogers later recognizes as Barnes. Rogers and Wilson later storm two Helicarriers and replace their controller chips, but Barnes destroys Wilson's suit and fights Rogers on the third Helicarrier. Rogers fends him off and replaces the final chip. Rogers refuses to fight Barnes in an attempt to reach his friend, but as the ship collides with the Triskelion, Rogers is thrown out into the Potomac River. Barnes, freed from Hydra's mind control, rescues the unconscious Rogers before disappearing into the woods. Later, Barnes visits his own memorial in the Captain America exhibit at the Smithsonian Institution.

Dealing with brainwashing

In 2016, Barnes is framed by ex-Sokovian special forces soldier Helmut Zemo for a bombing in Vienna that kills King T'Chaka of Wakanda. Rogers and Wilson find Barnes in Bucharest and attempt to protect him from T'Chaka's vengeful son, T'Challa, but all four, including T'Challa, are apprehended by the police and James Rhodes. With Barnes in custody, Zemo impersonates a psychiatrist and recites the Hydra brainwashing words to make Barnes obey him. He sends Barnes on a rampage to cover his own escape. Rogers stops Barnes and hides him. When Barnes regains his senses, he explains to Rogers and Wilson that Zemo is the real Vienna bomber and wanted the location of the Siberian Hydra base, where other brainwashed "Winter Soldiers" are kept in cryogenic stasis. Unwilling to wait for authorization to apprehend Zemo, Rogers and Wilson go rogue, and recruit Wanda Maximoff, Clint Barton, and Scott Lang to their cause. Tony Stark assembles a team composed of Romanoff, T'Challa, Rhodes, Vision, and Peter Parker to stop them. Stark's team intercepts Rogers' team at Leipzig/Halle Airport in Germany, where they fight until Romanoff allows Rogers and Barnes to escape. Rogers and Barnes go to the Siberian Hydra facility, when Stark arrives and strikes a truce with them. They find that the other super soldiers have been killed by Zemo, who then reveals himself and shows them footage of the 1991 car accident where Barnes killed Stark's parents as the Winter Soldier. Enraged that Rogers kept this from him, Stark turns on them both, leading to an intense fight in which Stark destroys Barnes' robotic arm and Rogers disables Stark's armor. Rogers departs with Barnes, leaving his shield behind. Later, Barnes, granted asylum in Wakanda, chooses to return to cryogenic sleep until a cure for his brainwashing is found.

Sometime later, Barnes is cured by T'Challa's sister Shuri, with the trigger words' effect being shown to be nullified by Ayo. 
Barnes is given the name "White Wolf" by the Wakandan people.

Infinity War and resurrection

In 2018, Barnes is given a new vibranium arm by T'Challa while still living in Wakanda. He reunites with Rogers after he, Wilson, Romanoff, Maximoff, Vision, Rhodes, and Bruce Banner arrive. He joins the battle against the Outriders and witnesses Thor, Rocket, and Groot's arrival. When Thanos arrives, completes the Infinity Gauntlet, and snaps his fingers. Barnes disintegrates along with Wilson, T'Challa, Maximoff, and Groot.

In 2023, Barnes is restored to life and brought to the destroyed Avengers Compound to the battle against an alternate 2014 Thanos. He later attends Stark's funeral and sees Rogers off, who returns the alternate Infinity Stones and Mjolnir to their timelines. When Banner is unable to bring Rogers back, Barnes points Wilson to a nearby park bench, and watches as an elderly Rogers passes his mantle to Wilson.

Partnering with Sam Wilson

In 2024, Barnes is living in Brooklyn, New York. He has been pardoned and attends government-mandated therapy, where he discusses his attempts to make amends for his time as the Winter Soldier. He has nightmares about his past, but is not forthcoming with his therapist about them. She notes that Barnes is isolating himself from his friends and has been ignoring texts from Sam Wilson. Barnes tells her that he made amends, including confronting a formerly Hydra-affiliated U.S. senator who he helps bring to justice. He also befriends an elderly Japanese man named Yori, the father of one of the Winter Soldier's victims, but doesn't tell him of their connection. Yori sets Barnes up on a date with a bartender named Leah, which ends quickly after she brings up Yori's deceased son and Barnes leaves.

Barnes soon learns that John Walker has been named the new Captain America by the U.S. government and he goes to a USAF base to confront Wilson about this, expressing his disapproval about Wilson having surrendered Rogers' shield. Barnes joins Wilson in tracking down the Flag Smashers in Munich where they intercept the group smuggling medicine and attempt to rescue a supposed hostage that ends up being their leader, Karli Morgenthau. Barnes and Wilson are overwhelmed by Flag Smashers who are revealed to be super soldiers. Walker and his partner, Lemar Hoskins, come to their aid, although the Flag Smashers escape. Walker asks Barnes and Wilson to join him in aiding the Global Repatriation Council (GRC) to quash the ongoing violent post-Blip revolutions, but they refuse. Traveling to Baltimore, Barnes introduces Wilson to Isaiah Bradley, a veteran American super soldier Barnes fought during the Korean War, but he refuses to help them uncover information about additional super soldier serums due to his disdain for Barnes and having been imprisoned and experimented on by the government for thirty years. Barnes is then arrested for missing a court-mandated therapy appointment, but is released when Walker intervenes.

Zemo and the Dora Milaje

Again refusing to work with Walker, Barnes suggests they visit Helmut Zemo, who is imprisoned in Berlin, to gather intelligence related to the super soldier Flag Smashers. Zemo, citing his hatred for super powered beings, agrees to help them. Barnes orchestrates a prison riot to help Zemo escape. Barnes, Zemo and Wilson travel to Madripoor in an effort to locate the source of the new super soldier serum. In a bar, Barnes pretends to once again be under mind control as the Winter Soldier, and dispatches numerous armed thugs. They are taken to high-ranking criminal, Selby, who reveals the Power Broker hired former Hydra scientist Dr. Wilfred Nagel to recreate the serum. Wilson's disguise is compromised and Selby orders her men to attack them but she is killed. Their savior, Sharon Carter (the Power Broker), has been living as a fugitive in Madripoor since 2016. She agrees to help them after Wilson offers to get her pardoned. They travel to Nagel's lab and confront him. He reveals that he made twenty vials of the serum and that Morgenthau stole them. Zemo unexpectedly kills Nagel and the lab is destroyed. Barnes, Wilson, and Carter fight bounty hunters until Zemo acquires a getaway car and they escape. Barnes, Zemo and Wilson travel to Latvia and Barnes recognizes Wakandan tracking devices. He confronts Dora Milaje Ayo, who demands Zemo.

Ayo gives Barnes eight hours to use Zemo before the Wakandans take him, as Zemo killed their king T'Chaka. When Ayo and the Dora Milaje come for Zemo, Walker refuses to hand him over, and Barnes intercedes, causing Ayo to use a failsafe that deactivates his vibranium arm.

Defeating the Flag Smashers

Walker, having taken a supersoldier serum and enraged by the death of his partner, Hoskins, uses his shield to kill one of the Flag Smashers in front of horrified bystanders, who film his actions. Wilson and Barnes demand the shield from Walker, starting a fight in which Walker destroys Wilson's wingsuit. The fight ends with Wilson and Barnes taking the shield and breaking Walker's arm. Barnes finds Zemo in Sokovia and hands him over to the Dora Milaje. Barnes later travels to Wilson's hometown in Louisiana to deliver a briefcase from the Wakandans to Wilson. He meets Wilson's sister, Sarah, and her two sons. After fixing the Wilson family's boat, Barnes and Wilson train with the shield and agree to move on from their pasts and work together. Barnes confesses that he was angry that Wilson gave away Captain America's shield because he feels like it is his last connection to the past, and apologizes for not considering the implications of giving the shield to a black man.

Barnes goes back to New York City and runs into Carter. He then fights against the Flag Smashers, as well as saving GRC hostages from arson. During a fight against Morgenthau, Barnes falls off the ledge to a riverbank. After Walker and the Flag Smashers do the same, Barnes helps Walker up and they join Wilson, who is in his new Captain America suit, to find the Flag Smashers after Georges Batroc helps them escape. Barnes and Walker ambush three of them and see them taken into custody. After the GRC members are rescued, Barnes listens to Wilson's speech, before leaving with an injured Carter. He then goes to Yori's apartment and tells him that he, as the Winter Soldier, killed his son. He delivers his completed notebook to his therapist's office and sees Leah again, before leaving for Louisiana. There he joins Wilson, Sarah, her sons, and the community for a cookout and opts to remain there with Wilson.

Alternate versions

Several alternate versions of Barnes appear in the animated series What If...?, with Stan reprising his role.

Fighting alongside Captain Carter

In an alternate 1943, Barnes fights alongside Captain Carter, Rogers, and the Howling Commandos during World War II.

Zombie outbreak

In an alternate 2018, Barnes is one of the remaining survivors on Earth after a quantum virus outbreak. While journeying to Camp Lehigh in search of a cure, Barnes is forced to kill a zombified Rogers and claims his shield. At the camp, the group fights Wanda Maximoff, and Barnes is left behind when he is telekinetically thrown away by Wanda Maximoff.

Characterization
In Captain America: The First Avenger, Barnes is a sergeant in the United States Army, the best friend of Steve Rogers, and member of his squad of commandos. Stan has signed on for "five or six pictures". He revealed that he did not know anything about the comic books, but watched a lot of documentaries and films about World War II in preparation for the role, calling Band of Brothers "very helpful". About the role, Stan stated, "Steve Rogers and Bucky are both orphans and kind of like brothers. They kind of grow up together and look after each other. It's a very human, relatable thing... I also wanted to look out for how their relationship changes once Steve Rogers becomes Captain America. There's always a competition and they're always one-upping each other. I paid attention to how Bucky is affected by Steve's change and suddenly Steve is this leader".

Bucky re-emerges in Captain America: The Winter Soldier as an enhanced brainwashed assassin after supposedly being killed in action during World War II. Regarding the character, producer Kevin Feige said, "Winter Soldier has been methodically, almost robotically, following orders for 70 years." Stan said despite his nine-picture deal with Marvel Studios including his appearance in The First Avenger, he was not sure that Bucky would make an imminent return, and only heard the sequel's official title was "The Winter Soldier" through a friend attending San Diego Comic-Con. Stan endured five months of physical training to prepare for the role and did historical research, stating, "I dove into the whole Cold War thing. I looked at the KGB. I looked at all kinds of spy movies, and all kinds of documentaries about that time, and what it was about. I grabbed anything from that time period. Anything about brainwashing". Stan also practiced daily with a plastic knife in order to be able to do the Winter Soldier's knife tricks without the aid of a stuntman. Regarding Bucky's transition into the Winter Soldier, Stan said, "You know, the truth of the situation is although he looks very different and there's different things about him, it still comes from the same person. I think you'll get to see that no matter what. I think part of my goal here was to make sure that you see an extension of that version but just a different color of that same version in a way. I think he's still the same guy; he's cut from the same cloth". Stan stated he felt the character's introduction in The Winter Soldier was "a preview of the guy", with more aspects of the character being explored in the film's sequel Captain America: Civil War.

This portrayal continues in Captain America: Civil War as an amalgam of Barnes and the Winter Soldier, with Stan saying, "here's the guy when you merge the two. This is what came out. To me, he's never really going to be Bucky Barnes again. There's going to be recognizable things about him, but his path through the [experiences of] Winter Soldier is always going to be there, haunting him." Because of this, the character has more lines in the film than in Winter Soldier. In Black Panther, Sebastian Stan makes an uncredited appearance in a post-credits scene, reprising his role as Barnes, being helped by Shuri to recover from his Hydra conditioning. In Avengers: Infinity War, Barnes is given the name White Wolf by the people of Wakanda, who helped remove his Hydra programming. Barnes is one of the many characters disintegrated by Thanos with the Infinity Gauntlet at the end of Infinity War who then returns to participate in the final battle at the end of Avengers: Endgame.

The character returned in The Falcon and the Winter Soldier, an American web television miniseries created for Disney+ by Malcolm Spellman, based on the characters. The events of the series take place six months after Avengers: Endgame. The series is produced by Marvel Studios, with Spellman serving as head writer and Kari Skogland directing. Anthony Mackie and Sebastian Stan reprise their roles as Falcon and Winter Soldier, respectively, from the film series. Daniel Brühl, Emily VanCamp, and Wyatt Russell also star. , Marvel Studios was developing a number of limited series for Disney+, centered on supporting characters from the MCU films, with Spellman hired to write one on Falcon and Winter Soldier in October. The series was officially confirmed in April 2019 along with Mackie and Stan's involvement. Skogland was hired the next month. Filming began in October 2019 in Atlanta, Georgia and was suspended in March 2020 due to the COVID-19 pandemic. Filming resumed in Atlanta in September before wrapping in the Czech Republic in October.

Reception

Owen Gleiberman of Entertainment Weekly stated that "Sebastian Stan puts Steve's old pal Bucky Barnes through a chilling transformation". In 2014 in a review of film Captain America: The Winter Soldier, Jake Coyle of the Associated Press felt that the character's limited development in the film, due to his true identity being "mysterious" was "the film's biggest misstep" since he is named in the film's title. He was critical of the film overall stating that it was "zippy but hollow" with "no shelf life". In Coyle's 2018 review of Avengers: Infinity War,  he praised the ensemble cast overall, which features the character in a limited role, writing that Marvel had gone "nuclear". Ed Brubaker, who introduced the Winter Soldier in the Captain America (vol. 5) comic book series, has expressed dissatisfaction with Marvel's compensation for his work. In an interview with Indie Wire about the character, Stan said "I have a lot of fans that reach out, writing about trauma and telling me about certain situations that they're going through and feeling empowered."

Awards and nominations

Notes

References

External links
 Bucky Barnes on the Marvel Cinematic Universe Wiki
 
 Bucky Barnes on Marvel.com

American male characters in television
Captain America (film series)
Captain America characters
Fictional American military snipers
Fictional Office of Strategic Services personnel
Fictional United States Army personnel
Fictional World War II veterans
Fictional amputees
Fictional assassins
Fictional characters displaced in time
Fictional characters from Brooklyn
Fictional characters with amnesia
Fictional characters with post-traumatic stress disorder
Fictional characters with slowed ageing
Fictional cryonically preserved characters
The Falcon and the Winter Soldier
Fictional gunfighters
Fictional fugitives
Fictional genetically engineered characters
Fictional knife-fighters
Fictional military captains
Fictional outlaws
Fictional super soldiers
Fictional vigilantes
Film characters introduced in 2011
Hydra (comics) agents
Male characters in film
Male characters in television
Marvel Cinematic Universe characters
Marvel Comics American superheroes
Marvel Comics characters with superhuman strength
Marvel Comics cyborgs
Marvel Comics male superheroes
Marvel Comics military personnel
Soviet Union-themed superheroes
Superheroes with alter egos